The Princess Margaret Hospital was a large hospital situated in Okus Road, Swindon, Wiltshire, England. It was managed by the Swindon and Marlborough NHS Trust.

History 
The hospital, which was built to replace the aging Victoria Hospital, was opened in phases: the outpatients department was opened in 1959 and the main block was opened by Princess Margaret in April 1966. After services transferred to the Great Western Hospital, the Princess Margaret Hospital closed on 3 December 2002.

The building was demolished in 2004 and the 25-acre site was redeveloped as housing.

See also 
 Healthcare in Wiltshire
 List of hospitals in England

References

External links 
 

Hospital buildings completed in 1966
Defunct hospitals in England
Buildings and structures in Swindon
Hospitals in Wiltshire
1966 establishments in England
Buildings and structures demolished in 2004
Demolished buildings and structures in England